Marshall Kornegay House and Cemetery is a historic plantation house located near Suttontown, Sampson County, North Carolina.   The house was built about 1835, and is a -story, four bay by three bay, transitional Federal / Greek Revival style frame dwelling.  It has a gable roof, rear ell, and one-story hip roofed front porch. The interior follows a hall-and-parlor plan. The house was restored in 1980–1981.  Also on the property is a contributing family cemetery.

It was added to the National Register of Historic Places in 1986.

References

Plantation houses in North Carolina
Houses on the National Register of Historic Places in North Carolina
Federal architecture in North Carolina
Greek Revival houses in North Carolina
Houses completed in 1835
Houses in Sampson County, North Carolina
National Register of Historic Places in Sampson County, North Carolina